Falls City Independent School District is a public school district based in Falls City, Texas (USA).

In addition to Falls City, the district also serves the unincorporated community of Hobson as well as rural areas in northwestern Karnes County and a small portion of southeastern Wilson County.

The district has two campuses: 
 Falls City High School (grades 7–12)
 Falls City/Luther Thomas Elementary (grades K-6)

In 2009, the school district was rated "exemplary" by the Texas Education Agency.

References

External links
 

School districts in Karnes County, Texas
School districts in Wilson County, Texas